In Canadian law, a reasonable apprehension of bias is a legal standard for disqualifying judges and administrative decision-makers for bias. Bias of the decision-maker can be real or merely perceived. 

The test was first stated in Committee for Justice and Liberty v. Canada (National Energy Board), [1978] 1 S.C.R. 369:

It was further developed in: 

  

Further:

Contrary evidence is addressed as follows:

It is a difficult matter to establish case law to support such a proposition.  Nevertheless, consider:

Definition of apprehension

The dictionary definition of apprehension, outside of the Canadian legal context, provides two distinct meanings: anxiety about something, or the perception or grasp of something. It does not appear that a reasonable person—most likely a reasonable Canadian person—is required to differentiate along this axis in specific terms when affirming legal apprehension of bias.

See also
 Conflict of interest
 R. v. R.D.S. (1997)
 Arsenault-Cameron v. Prince Edward Island (2000)

References

Law of Canada